Hammarby IF Fotbollförening, more commonly known as Hammarby Fotboll or Hammarby ( or, especially locally), is a Swedish football club from Stockholm founded in 1915. The club is based at Tele2 Arena in Johanneshov but founded in the neighbouring Södermalm district of Stockholm City Centre, an area the club considers its heartland.

Competing in Sweden's first tier, Allsvenskan, Hammarby are placed tenth in the all-time Allsvenskan table, and has won the league once, in 2001. The club has competed in the Svenska Cupen final five times, winning their first title in 2021.

The club's colours are green and white, which are reflected in its crest and kit. Between 1918 and 1978, however, the club played in black-and-yellow striped home shirts, which since often form the club's away colors.

It is known for its vociferous fans and for having the highest average attendance in the Nordic countries. Drawing inspiration from England, Hammarby fans introduced football chants to the Swedish terraces in 1970. Hammarby is one of largest football clubs in Europe in terms of the number of active players of all ages – with some 3,500 players in its organisation.

Hammarby is affiliated with the Stockholms Fotbollförbund (Stockholm Football Association).

History

In 1889, Hammarby Roddförening ("Hammarby Rowing Association") was established in Södermalm, with engineer Axel Robert Schönthal, the first chairman, being credited as the founder. By 1897, it had diversified into different sports, and was renamed Hammarby Idrottsförening ("Hammarby Sports Club"), or Hammarby IF for short.

1915–1940s: Establishment of football club
In 1915, the sporting ground Hammarby IP was built in Södermalm. Due to a lack of football pitches in Stockholm, several other clubs proposed to merge with Hammarby IF to get access to the stadium. An offer from Klara SK was accepted and Hammarby officially established a football department on 13 August 1915. The club played its first competitive game two days later, and won 5–0 against Västerås SK in the "Östsvenska serien", a local league, with Ragnar Gunnarsson scoring the inaugural goal. In 1916, Hammarby competed in Svenska Mästerskapet, a cup by then held to decide the Swedish Champions, for the first time. In 1918, Hammarby also merged with Johanneshofs IF, a club from the neighbouring district Johanneshov.

In 1920, Hammarby first competed in the Svenska Serien, by then the highest league in Swedish football, with key players like goalkeeper Victor Olsson, defender Gösta Wihlborg and forward Gustav Björk. During the upcoming years, Hammarby had a strong showing where they went to the finals of Svenska Mästerskapet in 1922, losing 1–3 to GAIS.

Hammarby qualified to compete in Allsvenskan's inaugural season in 1924. On 3 August said year, Rikard Larsson became Hammarby's first goalscorer in Allsvenskan, and also the first goalscorer in the league's history, in a 1–5 loss against Örgryte IS. The club would eventually finish last in the 1924–25 Allsvenskan, and were relegated to Division 2, which was then the second highest league in Sweden.

During the upcoming years, Hammarby failed to produce any sort of challenge in Swedish football. Several star players emigrated to the United States, transferred to other clubs or opted to instead play ice hockey for Hammarby. In 1936–37 and 1937–38, the club won the second division, but lost the playoff matches that would have promoted them to Allsvenskan. Instead, Hammarby got promoted in 1938–39, where they knocked out IFK Norrköping following outstanding performances from goalkeeper and star player Sven Bergqvist.

Hammarby would, however, suffer from another relegation, finishing last in Allsvenskan in 1939–40. Back in Division 2, the club finished in the top four for the next six years. In the 1946–47 season, the club finished at the foot of the table, and because of a restructuring of the league system, the club got relegated to Division 4.

1950s–1960s: A period of yo-yoing

Hammarby did not return to the second highest league until the 1950–51 season. In the 1954–55 season, the club returned to Allsvenskan, but this time it finished sixth and managed to stay for another season. However, the club underwent yo-yoing, having been promoted and relegated between Allsvenskan and Division 2 seven times until 1970. Nacka Skoglund, one of the league's top players who played for Hammarby from 1944 to 1949, returned to Hammarby to play from 1964 to 1967. In his return debut, he landed a corner kick into the goal minutes into the match; in 1984, the club erected the Nackas Hörna (Nacka's corner) statue with his kick as the pose.

1970s–1980s: Stable Allsvenskan years
In the 1970 Allsvenskan season, Hammarby had acquired only 3 points in the spring portion of the season, but during the autumn, showed a dramatic improvement. With star players Kenneth Ohlsson and Ronnie Hellström, and with a crowd that tried out supporter songs for the first time, the club went through the autumn half undefeated and finished in fifth place, its best showing in Allsvenskan. The club would stay in Allsvenskan through the rest of the 1970s, attracting large crowds, despite not returning above fifth place. Also in 1978, the club changed from black/yellow to green/white colours.

In the 1982 season, Swedish football introduced a playoff system for the top 8 teams in Allsvenskan to decide a champion. The playoffs consisted of two matches in which the aggregate score would determine who would advance. The club had placed second overall that season and had not lost a home game. After defeating Örgryte in the quarter-finals, and coming back from a 1–3 deficit to beat Elfsborg 4–3 in the semi-finals, Hammarby was in the final against IFK Göteborg. Hammarby won its away match 2–1, but lost 1–3 in its home match to a sold out crowd.

In the following year, Hammarby finished fifth in the league, but lost to AIK in the play-offs. In the Svenska Cupen tournament, Hammarby reached the finals but lost against IFK. However, since IFK qualified for the UEFA Cup that year, Hammarby qualified for the UEFA Cup Winners' Cup, its first major international competition, where the club lost to Finland's FC Haka in the second round. The Hammarby squads finished consistently in the top six in the league every year through 1987.

In 1988, Hammarby finished last in the standings and were relegated to the second tier. Although the club placed first in 1989, it finished last in 1990.

1990s–2000s: Tough nineties, restructuring, champions

Hammarby would stay in the second tier in 1991 and 1992, but in 1993, the team finished in first place and were promoted to Allsvenskan. In 1995 Allsvenskan, the team finished last and were relegated, but returned to the 1998 Allsvenskan with a third-place finish.

Prior to the 2001 Allsvenskan season, the club had financially tough times, leading experts to conclude that the team was weak, and one journalist predicted a last place finish. Halfway through the 2001 season, manager Sören Cratz was informed that his contract would not be extended because the club's board wanted Hammarby to play a positive, attacking and fun football, something the board did not think that Cratz did. However, the club took the lead in the standings and in the second-to-last match, which was against Örgryte IS on 21 October, the club won 3–2 and secured its first ever Allsvenskan championship.

Hammarby stayed in Allsvenskan for the rest of the 2000s: In 2003 Allsvenskan the club finished second, and participated in the second qualifying and first rounds of the 2004–05 UEFA Cup. In 2006 Allsvenskan, Hammarby placed third overall and advanced to the UEFA Intertoto Cup, where they won their third round match, which advanced the team to the second qualifying and first rounds of the 2007–08 UEFA Cup.

In 2007, Bajen finished on the sixth place, and didn't qualify for any European cups. In 2008, Hammarby finished ninth, but 2009 was a disastrous year where the team finished last in the league and was relegated to the second tier known as Superettan.

2010–2014: Superettan
The 2010 Superettan was a letdown for supporters who had hoped to make the visit to Sweden's second tier short, as the team finished 8th. In the 2010 Svenska Cupen, Hammarby fared better, winning against multiple Allsvenskan opponents, until the finals where the team lost 0–1 to Helsingborgs IF. In the 2011 Superettan season, the club finished in a tie for 11th, its worst overall ranking in 64 years. The club was almost relegated to the third tier, until a game-winning kick in the season's final match against Ängelholm. After the season of 2011, Hammarby dismantled their development team HTFF, which was established in 2003. In 2012 Superettan, the club finished fourth, and in 2013 Superettan the club finished fifth. In 2014, in the last round of the season, Hammarby were promoted to the first tier, Allsvenskan, by finishing first in Superettan.

2015–: Top-flight comeback and cup title
The 2015 season started off well, with Hammarby managing an impressive 1–2 away win against local rivals AIK in the 2015 Swedish Cup, which also was the first Stockholm derby involving Hammarby since 2009. This was followed up with a 2–0 win in the season opener against BK Häcken, and in the fourth round Hammarby defeated their other local rivals Djurgårdens IF with 2–1. The summer was, however, tougher for the club, with Hammarby playing 10 consecutive league games without winning, before managing to defeat Falkenbergs FF at home with 3–0. Eventually, Hammarby finished at 11th place in their first Allsvenskan season since 2009.

The 2016 and 2017 seasons showed only a slight improvement for Hammarby, with the team ending in the 11th and 9th position respectively. Hammarby fared better in the local derbys. In 2016 Hammarby defeated the local rival Djurgården in all three fixtures. In 2017 the first encounter ended with a draw and the second with a Hammarby victory. The second local rival, AIK, managed to defeat Hammarby by 3–0 in the first encounter in the league and a draw (0–0) in the second. Hammarby however beat AIK in the Swedish cup, earlier in the year. In 2017 the Hammarby – AIK encounters ended with one Hammarby win and one draw. Both Djurgården and AIK, however, fared much better overall than Hammarby in the league.

The club fared much better in 2018 under the reign of new manager Stefan Billborn, finishing 4th in the league. In 2019, Hammarby started the league play in a mediocre fashion, but made a strong finish to the season (with eight straight wins in the final eight games of the season) and ultimately finished 3rd in Allsvenskan. This meant that the club qualified for the 2020–21 UEFA Europa League, their first continental competition in over ten years.

Hammarby IF won the 2020–21 Svenska Cupen, their first title in the main domestic cup, through a 5–4 win on penalties (0–0 after full-time) against BK Häcken in the final. On 11 June 2021, Hammarby decided to terminate manager Stefan Billborn's contract, with the club placed 8th in the 2021 Allsvenskan table after eight rounds. On 13 June, Miloš Milojević, most recently an assistant at Red Star Belgrade, was appointed new head coach. Under the leadership of Milojević, Hammarby nearly reached the group stages of the first edition of the UEFA Conference League, only being defeated on penalties by FC Basel in the playoff. Nevertheless, Milojević was fired following the conclusion of the 2021 Allsvenskan, and Martí Cifuentes was hired as head coach in January 2022.

Colours, badge and kit

Colours and badge
When Hammarby Roddförening (Hammarby RF) was founded in 1889, the club's crest consisted of a white flag with three green horizontal lines. It drew inspiration from two other competing rowing clubs in Stockholm that used two blue and two red lines respectively on a white flag, but chose the colour green since it represented hope. Hammarby eventually added a third stripe when it discovered that Göteborgs RF used a similar green-white flag with two stripes.

Kit

When Hammarby IF founded its football club in 1915, it determined the kit to be the following: a white hat with a five-pointed green star, a white shirt with "HIF" on its chest, white shorts and black socks. Following the merger with Johanneshovs IF in 1918, the club changed its football team apparel to Johanneshov's black-and-yellow striped shirts, blue shorts and black socks with yellow stripes. The first department to use the new kit was Hammarby Bandy, with the football department adopting it soon thereafter.

In the 1960s, the club changed from blue shorts to black. When "Nacka" Skoglund rejoined the club in 1964, he donated the club a set of black shorts because he thought the team's blue shorts looked awful.

In 1978, 60 years after the merger with Johanneshov, Hammarby changed its home colours from black and yellow to white shirts, green shorts and white socks. In 1997, the striped shirts returned, but with green and white colours, with green shorts and white socks. The yellow and black colours were retained for the away and third kits. Since 1997, only a few exceptions have been made to the green-and-white-striped home and the black-and-yellow-striped away shirts: In 2002 and 2014–2016, the team wore all-white jerseys, and in 2011 the team wore an all-grey away kit.

Sponsors
Craft is Hammarby's kit manufacturer. Also visible on the club's kit, in 2021, were the logos of the following sponsors: Huski Chocolate, a drinks company; Limitado, a mobile phone accessories seller; automakers Volkswagen; sporting-goods retailer Intersport; pawnbroker Sefina pantbank; cruiseferry operator Silja Line; BST, a transportation company; Grönsakshuset, a vegetable and fruit company; Clinton, a construction measurement company; and league sponsors Unibet, a gambling company (whose logo is on the right sleeve of the shirts of all Allsvenskan teams).

Ownership and finance

Ownership
Hammarby IF was reorganised as an umbrella organisation in 1999, with each of the individual sports departments breaking off to form independent clubs; the football club was then named Hammarby IF Fotbollförening (Hammarby IF FF).

In 2001, the football club split the A team, B team and youth team into separate legal entities. A limited company called Hammarby Fotboll AB was founded, in which the parent football club owns a majority stake. In Sweden, all sport teams in the league systems are regulated to be non-profit associations, which means that a majority of the voting rights, according to the "51 percent-rule", is controlled by the members of the club.

Anschutz Entertainment Group (AEG), the founder and owner of Major League Soccer club LA Galaxy, was the biggest external investor and minority shareholder of Hammarby Fotboll AB between 2001 and 2019.

On 27 November 2019, it was announced that Zlatan Ibrahimović, widely regarded to be the greatest Swedish football player of all-time, had acquired 23.5 percent of the outstanding shares in Hammarby, which meant that AEG reduced their stake by half.

Finance
At the end of 2022, the club held an equity of 115,6 million SEK. The turnover for 2022 was 316,3 million SEK.

The highest transfer fee received by Hammarby for a player was reportedly 50 millon SEK for Williot Swedberg who was sold to RC Celta de Vigo in 2022, followed by 46 million SEK for Akinkunmi Amoo who left for F.C. Copenhagen in 2022, 44 million SEK for Odilon Kossounou who transferred to Club Brugge in 2019, and 30 million SEK for Aziz Ouattara Mohammed who was signed by Genk in 2022.

Supporters

The club's nickname is "Bajen". A fan of Hammarby is referred to as a bajare or a hammarbyare.

Hammarby has historically been regarded as a club with a mainly working-class fan base, due to its connection with the formerly working-class (but today gentrified) Södermalm district of Stockholm. Nowadays the club attracts fans from all parts of society. According to a 2016 poll, a large part of the club's fan base tends to support left-wing politics compared to those of their local rivals AIK and Djurgården.

Hammarby has strong ties to Söderort, the southern part of Stockholm urban area. A 2012 poll showed that Hammarby was the most popular club in Söderort; 40 percent of the area's residents who had a favourite club chose Hammarby.

Hammarby's training ground, Årsta Idrottsplats, is located in the district of Johanneshov, while some of the older youth teams still play at Hammarby IP in Södermalm.

Rivalries
The club's main rivals are Djurgårdens IF and AIK, also from the Stockholm urban area. Hammarby and Djurgården have been tenants at the same arena, Tele2 Arena, since 2013.

Attendances
Since 2014, Hammarby has had the highest average attendance in Scandinavia, except for in 2020 and 2021 when matches were partly played behind closed doors due to the COVID-19 pandemic.

The club's average attendance for the 2015 season was 25,507, a new record high for Swedish top-division football. The former record was set back in 1959, when Örgryte IS had an average home attendance of 25,490. In 2022, Hammarby broke a new Allsvenskan record, drawing an average attendance of 26,372.

Notable supporters

Hammarby has had a slew of celebrity fans throughout the years, mostly cultural professionals living in Södermalm. In 1942, the popular recording artist Alice Babs released a version of the song Vårat gäng ("Our Gang") with new, Hammarby-related lyrics. Critically acclaimed author Per Anders Fogelström, who rose to fame with his 1960 novel Mina drömmars stad ("City of My Dreams"), with a narrative that follows a group of working-class people in Södermalm between 1860 and 1880, was also a supporter of Hammarby. In 1962, writer and illustrator Stig "Slas" Claesson penned a short story, Supportern ("The Supporter"), about his love for the club.

Hollywood actors Alexander Skarsgård and Joel Kinnaman are supporters of Hammarby, and have acted in several skits to promote the club.

Club culture

The club's unofficial hymn is "Just idag är jag stark". Released in 1979, it was performed and co-written by Kenta Gustafsson, who was a notable Hammarby fan. The recording has been the team's entrance music since 2004.

Hammarby has several supporter clubs, the largest of which, Bajen Fans, had over 6,000 members in 2012 and is one of the largest in Scandinavia. Hammarby also has a number of ultras such as Hammarby Ultras, Ultra Boys, Söder Bröder, and E1 Ultras – who together organize the club's terrace choreography. Hammarby Ultras won "tifo of the year" in both 2000 and 2005, an award handed out by the Swedish Football Association.

The club is known for its vociferous fans. Drawing inspiration from England, Hammarby fans introduced football chants to the Swedish terraces in 1970. In the 1982 finals against IFK Göteborg, Hammarby supporters attracted much attention for bringing a live samba band to the stands to accompany their chants, inspired by supporters in South America. In 2008, sports broadcaster Setanta Sports listed Söderstadion, Hammarby's home ground at the time, as the 11th noisiest stadium in the world.

Before the first league home game of the season, Hammarby fans gather at Medborgarplatsen in Södermalm. They then march together along Götgatan and cross the Skanstullsbron bridge before arriving at the stadium in Johanneshov. This tradition has taken place since 1998 and annually attracts between 15,000 and 20,000 supporters.

Players

First-team squad

Youth players with first-team experience

Out on loan

Retired numbers

Notable players

List criteria:
 player has made more than 300 appearances overall for the club, or
 player has won Guldbollen, is a member of the Swedish football Hall of Fame, has been named Allsvenskan top scorer of the year, or
 player has been picked as a top ten club profile, decided by the supporters in 2004 in an official voting called "Tidernas största Bajenprofiler".

Management

Organisation

Technical staff

Coaching history

Honours

Domestic
 Swedish Champions
 Winners (1): 2001

League
 Allsvenskan
 Winners (1): 2001
 Runners-up (2): 1982, 2003
 Superettan
 Winners (1): 2014
 Division 1 Norra
 Winners (3): 1989, 1993, 1997
 Runners-up (1): 1996
 Division 1 Östra
 Winners (1): 1991

Cups
 Svenska Cupen
 Winners (1): 2020–21
 Runners-up (4): 1976–77, 1982–83, 2010, 2021–22
 Svenska Mästerskapet
 Runners-up (1): 1922

European
 UEFA Intertoto Cup
 Co-winners (1): 2007 UEFA Intertoto Cup

International play

European games
Hammarby has occasionally qualified for play in competitions where the team has competed with clubs from other European countries.

Records
 Highest attendance, Råsunda Stadium: 35,929 (against IFK Lidingö, 14 September 1941)
 Highest attendance, Tele2 Arena: 31,810 (against BK Häcken, 4 November 2018)
 Highest attendance, Söderstadion: 22,000 (against IFK Göteborg, 31 October 1982)
 Biggest win, Allsvenskan: 7–0 (against Halmstad BK, 1 October 1972); 7–0 (against Enköpings SK, 29 September 2003)
 Biggest loss, Allsvenskan: 1–9 (against Djurgårdens IF, 13 August 1990); 0–8 (against IFK Göteborg, 2 June 1925)
 Most goals scored, Allsvenskan: 94, Billy Ohlsson (1972–86)
 Most appearances (including non-league), total: 400, Kenneth "Kenta" Ohlsson (1966–83)

Other departments

Women

 
Hammarby IF DFF are the women's football club affiliated to Hammarby Fotboll. Hammarby Damfotbollförening was first founded in 1970 as a section under Hammarby IF. In 1999 the association was reorganized and all the underlying sections got separated into an umbrella organization. Before the start of the 2017 season, Hammarby IF DFF was merged with Hammarby Fotboll.

Hammarby won the top tier Damallsvenskan in 1985 and two national cups in 1994 and 1995. In 1994 it was also the championship's runner-up. Previously, the team had been the cup's runner-up in its first three editions (1981–83). The home ground of the women's team is Hammarby IP, although occasionally they have played competitive games at Zinkensdamms IP and Tele2 Arena.

Futsal
 
In May 2016, Hammarby announced that they would establish a men's senior futsal team. Playing their home games in Eriksdalshallen, Hammarby competed in the Swedish second tier, Division 1 Södra Svealand, during their inaugural season. In 2017, Hammarby won promotion to the Swedish Futsal League, the premier championship.

Footnotes

Works cited

Notes

References

External links

 
 

 
Allsvenskan clubs
Association football clubs established in 1915
Football clubs in Stockholm
Football clubs in Stockholm County
Sport in Stockholm
Hammarby IF
1915 establishments in Sweden
Svenska Cupen winners